353 North Clark is a  tall skyscraper in Chicago, Illinois. The building began construction in 2007 and was completed in 2009. In 2014, Empire, a TV series created for FOX, began filming in its lobby.

See also
List of tallest buildings in Chicago

External links
Official website

Skyscraper office buildings in Chicago
Office buildings completed in 2009
2009 establishments in Illinois
Leadership in Energy and Environmental Design gold certified buildings